Lison is a given name and a surname. Notable people with the name include: 

given name
Lison Nowaczyk (born 2003), French swimmer

surname
Lucien Lison (1908–1984), Belgian/Brazilian physician and biomedical scientist
Marek Lisoň (born 1990), Slovak ice hockey player